San Fermin is the self-titled debut album by chamber pop collective San Fermin. It was developed, written, and produced by composer Ellis Ludwig-Leone and performed by a loose collection of New York-based musicians who performed Ludwig-Leone's composition under the name San Fermin. An official band came about after the recording of the record. San Fermin received critical acclaim from outlets including NPR and Pitchfork.

Development 
After graduating from Yale in 2011, Ludwig-Leone retreated to Canada's secluded Banff Centre, where he wrote what would eventually become San Fermin. He wrote most of the record between October and December 2011. He returned to New York and began recording the album, completing the recording sessions during July 2012.

Nineteen people made up San Fermin in the recording process, in addition to other musical contributors. These included Ellis Ludwig-Leone, singer Allen Tate, saxophonist Stephen Chen, and trumpeter John Brandon who would form the core San Fermin the next decade. Additionally, acclaimed contemporary classical musicians Caroline Shaw, Rob Moose, and Nadia Sirota took part in the recording process.

Release and reception 
Initially, Ludwig-Leone intended San Fermin to be a one-off composition project. However, after debuting the record live in December, Ludwig-Leone received a record deal offer from Downtown Records that made him reconsider the scope of the San Fermin project.

San Fermin released their lead single "Sonsick" on December 4, 2012, premiering it on the music blog Beats Per Minute. Pitchfork gave the single a positive review, declaring the song "deliriously infectious." The full record was intended to be self-released in February 2013, but, after signing to Downtown Records, the release was pushed back first to June then to the September of that year.

San Fermin released their self-titled debut on September 17, 2013 to positive reviews. NPR called the record "one of the year's most surprising, ambitious, evocative and moving records," praising Ludwig-Leone for his ability to write a collection of songs "as easy to love as they are to admire." Pitchfork also gave the album a positive review. The album reached #18 on the Billboard Top Heatseekers album chart.

In 2013, the band also released a track-by-track album of commentary album featuring Ludwig-Leone.

Track listing 
All tracks produced and written by Ellis Ludwig-Leone.

Personnel 
Adapted from liner notes.

San Fermin

 Allen Tate – vocals
 Lucius (Jess Wolfe & Holly Laessig) – vocals, background vocals
 Helen McCreary – background vocals
 Gabriella Tortorello – background vocals
 Emily Misch – background vocals
 Stephen Chen – saxophone
 John Brandon – trumpet
 Jennifer Griggs – trombone
 Brian Reese – trombone
 Matthew Fried – tuba
 Rob Moose – violin
 Caroline Shaw – violin
 Nadia Sirota – viola
 Clarice Jensen – cello
 Helen Kashap – harmonium
 Ellis Ludwig-Leone – piano, keyboards
 Nathan Prillaman – guitar
 Nick Jenkins – drums

Additional musicians

 Nathan Petitpas – glockenspiel, vibraphone, bass drum
 Laura Bowler – additional vocals (10)
 Alex Goodman – additional acoustic guitar (6)
 Dan Molad – additional percussion (1)

Technical and production

 Ellis Ludwig-Leone – producer, engineer, design concept
 Dan Molad – additional production, engineer
 Eric Elterman – engineer
 Chris Camilieri – engineer
 Joe Fingerote – engineer
 Jeff Lipton – mastering engineer
 Maria Rice – assistant mastering engineer
 Stephen Halker – design concept, album art
 Thomas Winkler – management

References 

2013 debut albums